Fiontán Ó Curraoin (born 29 August 1992 in Galway) is an Irish Gaelic footballer and teacher from Galway. Ó Curraoin plays his club football with Míchael Breathnach. He played at senior level for the Galway county team from 2011 onwards.

Ó Curraoin was a key part of Galway GAA's Under 21 All-Ireland wins of 2011 and 2013.

He won the Sigerson Cup with DCU in 2012.

Ó Curraoin injured himself while playing for Galway against Mayo in the FBD Insurance League in January 2020 and required hospital treatment.

Ó Curraoin withdrew from the Galway panel ahead of the 2021 season.

He is a teacher at Coláiste Bhaile Chláir in Claregalway.

Honours
Galway
Connacht Under-21 Football Championship (2): 2011, 2013
All-Ireland Under-21 Football Championship (2): 2011, 2013
Connacht Senior Football Championship (2): 2016, 2018

References

1992 births
Living people
DCU Gaelic footballers
Galway inter-county Gaelic footballers
Irish schoolteachers